Yossef Av-Gay, born in 1961, is a Canadian microbiologist of Israeli origin. He is a professor of Infectious Diseases in the Faculty of Medicine at University of British Columbia, Vancouver, BC, Canada. He is also an associate member of the department of microbiology and immunology and holds an adjunct professorship at the medical school of Ben-Gurion University of the Negev, Israel.

Education
Av-Gay received his BSc in Biology, MSc in Microbiology, and PhD in Microbial Genetics – all from Tel Aviv University, Tel Aviv, Israel, and advanced training at John Innes Institute, Norwich, UK, Albert Einstein College of Medicine, New York and The University of British Columbia, Department of Microbiology, Vancouver, Canada.

Research work
A microbiologist by training, his research interests lie with chronic lung diseases, primarily tuberculosis (TB), followed by nontuberculous mycobacteria (NTM) diseases. He explores molecular events that govern host-pathogen interactions and the ability of mycobacteria to block the immune response to infection. Av-Gay's research is geared towards the identification and characterization of novel drugs and drug targets in Mycobacterium tuberculosis,  and COVID-19. 

His early work characterized and identified mycothiol (MSH) biosynthetic pathway in Mycobacteria. Mtb utilizes the glutathione's (GSH) thiol analogs mycothiol and ergothioneine (EGT) to neutralize xenobiotics and free radicals. His research group further demonstrated that MSH is a key cytoprotectant in Mtb and EGT has a role in persistence and long-term infection of macrophages.

Av-Gay's most significant discovery was the identification and characterization of PtpA, a protein phosphatase in Mtb which inhibits the normal macrophage response to infection.

Av-Gay authored over 100 peer review scientific publications, review articles, book chapters and 15 patents. Av-Gay served as an editor for the Journal of Biological Chemistry (2010-2015), and on scientific advisory boards of several biotechnology companies. Av-Gay is a member of the scientific review panels of the Canadian Institutes of Health Research (Microbiology and Infectious Disease (2009-2016) and Foundation and Project Grants (2016-), the French Agence nationale de la recherche, Innovative Medicine Innovations, The UK welcome Trust, US National Institutes of Health, and the European Commission FP6, FP7 and Horizon 2020 programs. He is also the founder of two startup companies: Enox Biopharma and the NASDAQ traded company Beyond Air.

References

External links 
 
 Patents by Inventor Yossef Av-Gay

Canadian microbiologists
Israeli microbiologists
Academic staff of the University of British Columbia
Academic staff of Ben-Gurion University of the Negev
1961 births
Living people
Tel Aviv University alumni
Albert Einstein College of Medicine alumni
University of British Columbia alumni
Israeli emigrants to Canada